Edgewater may refer to:

Australia
Edgewater, Western Australia

United States
 Edgewater, Alabama
 Edgewater, Colorado
 Florida:
Edgewater, Broward County, Florida
Edgewater, Volusia County, Florida
Edgewater High School, in Orlando, Florida
Edgewater (Miami), a neighborhood within the City of Miami
 Illinois:
Edgewater, Chicago, Illinois
Edgewater Beach Hotel
Edgewater Presbyterian Church
Edgewater Park Site, an Iowa archaeological site
Edgewater, Maryland
Edgewater, New Jersey
 New York State:
Edgewater (Cooperstown, New York), a building in the Cooperstown Historic District
Edgewater (Barrytown, New York), an historic mansion
Edgewater, Cleveland, Ohio
 Wisconsin:
Edgewater, Wisconsin
Edgewater (community), Wisconsin

Canada
Edgewater, British Columbia

Other uses
Edgewater (band), from Dallas, Texas
Edgewater (album), a 1999 album

See also
Edgewater Hotel (disambiguation)
Edgewater Park (disambiguation)
Edgewater Technology, a technology management consulting firm headquartered in Wakefield, Massachusetts